Ekjon Shonge Chilo is a 2007 Bangladeshi film starring Riaz, Moushumi and Kazi Hayat. It was produced under the banner of Impress Telefilms.

Awards
At the Bachsas Awards, the film won Best Actress for Moushumi, Best Dialogue for Mujtaba Saud, and Best Story for Syed Shamsul Haque.

References

External links
 

2007 films
Bengali-language Bangladeshi films
2000s Bengali-language films
Impress Telefilm films